The 2012–13 High Point Panthers men's basketball team represented High Point University during the 2012–13 NCAA Division I men's basketball season. The Panthers, led by fourth year head coach Scott Cherry, played their home games at the Millis Athletic Convocation Center and were members of the North Division of the Big South Conference. They finished the season 17–14, 12–4 in Big South play to be champions of the North Division. They lost in the quarterfinals of the Big South tournament to Liberty. They were invited to the 2013 CIT where they lost in the first round to UC Irvine.

Roster

Schedule

|-
!colspan=9| Exhibition

|-
!colspan=9| Regular season

|-
!colspan=9| 2013 Big South Conference men's basketball tournament

|-
!colspan=9| 2013 CIT

References

High Point Panthers men's basketball seasons
High Point
High Point
High Point Panthers men's basketball team
High Point Panthers men's basketball team